Decatur Township, Ohio, may refer to:

Decatur Township, Lawrence County, Ohio
Decatur Township, Washington County, Ohio

Ohio township disambiguation pages